Jeon (煎) is a fritter in Korean cuisine made by seasoning whole, sliced, or minced fish, meat, vegetables, etc., and coating them with wheat flour and egg wash before frying them in oil. Jeon can be made with ingredients such as fish, meat, poultry, seafood, and vegetable, and be served as an appetizer, a banchan (side dish), or an anju (food served and eaten with drinks). Some jeons are sweet desserts; one such variety is called hwajeon (literally "flower jeon").

Names 
Although jeon can be considered a type of buchimgae in a wider sense, buchimgae and jeons are different dishes. Jeons are smaller and made with fewer ingredients than buchimgae.

Jeon can also be called jeonya, especially in Korean royal court cuisine context. Jeonya is sometimes called jeonyueo or jeonyuhwa .

The variety of jeon made for jesa (ancestral rite) are called gannap. Gannap are usually made of beef liver, omasum, or fish.

Types
Almost all jeons are seasoned, coated with wheat flour and egg wash, and then pan-fried.

Meat 
Jeon made of red meat and poultry were used extensively in Korean royal court cuisine, while the food for ordinary folks tends to have some vegetable added to them. Yukjeon ("meat jeon") is a generic term for a variety of jeon made of meat.
 Deunggol-jeon – made of beef spinal cord.
 Donggeurang-ttaeng – little patties made of beef, pork, or fish with crumbled tofu, chopped scallions and namuls. Called don-jeonya ("coin jeonya") in Korean royal court cuisine.
 Meat jun – a popular Korean dish in Hawaii.

Korean royal court cuisine
 Chamsae-jeonya – made of sparrow meat.
 Cheonyeop-jeonya – made of beef omasum.
 Daechang-jeonya – made of boiled beef intestine.
 Dak-jeonya – made of chicken.
 Gan-jeonya – made of beef or pork liver.
 Gogi-jeonya – made of thinly sliced or finely minced beef.
 Gol-jeonya – made of boiled and sliced beef brain or beef spinal cord.
 Jeyuk-jeonya – made of thinly sliced lean pork.
 Mechuri-jeonya – made of thinly sliced quail meat.
 Nogyuk-jeonya – made of thinly sliced venison.
 Saengchi-jeonya – made of pheasant meat.
 Satae-jeonya – made of boiled and thinly sliced beef shank.
 Seonji-jeonya – made of blanched and seasoned seonji (blood).
 Soeseo-jeonya – made of thinly sliced beef tongue.
 Yang-jeonya – made of thinly sliced beef tripe.
 Yangyuk-jeonya – made of thinly sliced lamb.

Seafood
Saengseon-jeon ("fish jeon") is a generic term for any jeon made of fish. White fish are usually preferred. Haemul-jeon ("seafood jeon") includes the jeon made of fish as well as shellfish, shrimps, and octopuses. 
 Daeha-jeon – made of fleshy prawn.
 Guljeon – made of oysters. Called gul-jeonya in Korean royal court cuisine.
 Haesam-jeon –  made of dried and soaked sea cucumbers, usually with ground beef and crumbled tofu attached on them. Also called mwissam.
 Saeu-jeon – made of peeled shrimp. Called saeu-jeonya in Korean royal court cuisine.
Daegu-jeon (대구전) - made of codfish.

Korean royal court cuisine
 Baendaengi-jeonya – made of a whole sardinella. 
 Baengeo-jeonya – made of multiple halved whitebaits
 Bajirak-jeonya – made of Manila clam.
 Bangeo-jeonya – made of salted and thinly sliced
 Biut-jeonya – made of herring.
 Bok-jeonya – made of pufferfish.
 Bugeo-jeonya – made of dried pollock.
 Bungeo-jeonya – made of thinly sliced carp.
 Bure-jeonya – made by stuffing the swim bladder of a croaker with croaker flesh and ground beef, then sealining and boiling it, and slicing it before coating it with wheat flour and egg wash and pan-frying it.
 Daegu-jeonya – made of thinly sliced cod. 
 Domi-jeonya – made of thinly sliced sea bream.
 Gajami-jeonya – made of flatfish flesh crushed with wheat flour and chopped scallions. 
 Garimat-jeonya – made of razor clam.
 Ge-jeonya – made of a whole crab.
 Godeungeo-jeonya – made of thinly sliced chub mackerel.
 Iri-jeonya – made of salted milt.
 Jogae-jeonya – made of shellfish.
 Junchi-jeonya – made of elongate ilisha. 
 Mikkuri-jeonya – made of salted pond loach.
 Mineo-jeonya – made of thinly sliced croaker.
 Myeolchi-jeonya – made of salted anchovy.
 Nakji-jeonya – made of skinned and thinly sliced long arm octopus.
 Neopchi-jeonya – made of thinly sliced olive flounder.
 Samchi-jeonya – made of thinly sliced and salted seerfish.
 Ssogari-jeonya – made of golden mandarin fish.
 Sungeo-jeonya – made of thinly sliced mullet.
 Yeoneo-jeonya – made of thinly sliced salmon.

Vegetables and mushrooms
Chaeso-jeon ("vegetable jeon") is a generic term for any jeon made of vegetables.
 Gamja-jeon – made of shredded potato. Also can be made of grated, squeezed potato with potato starch and vegetables added to it.
 Pajeon – made of scallions. Dongnae-pajeon is usually made of whole scallions. Seafood is added in haemul-pajeon (literally "seafood pajeon").
 Deodeok-jeon, made of lance asiabell.
 Dubu-jeon – made of sliced tofu. Called dubu-jeonya in Korean royal court cuisine.
 Gaji-jeon – made of thinly sliced eggplant.
 Gamnip-jeon –
 Gochu-jeon – made of deseeded green chili pepper, filled with ground meat and crumbled tofu.
 Gosari-jeon, made with bracken.
 Gugyeop-jeon – made of leaves of chrysanths.
 Hobak-jeon, made of thinly sliced Korean zucchini
 Mukjeon – made of thinly sliced and dried muk of three different colours. Called muk-jeonya in Korean royal court cuisine.
 Pyogo-jeon, made of shiitake mushrooms and ground beef.
 Samsaekjeon – literally "three colour jeon". Made of mushrooms, green chili peppers, and onions.
 Ssukjeon – made of mugwort.
 Buchu-jeon – made of  garlic chives.

Korean royal court cuisine
 Baechu-jeonya – made of the white part of napa cabbage or washed kimchi, with ground beef.
 Baekhap-jeonya – made of sliced scaly bulbs of lily.
 Beoseot-jeonya – made of sliced mushrooms. 
 Bibimbap-jeonya – made of a spoonful or two of bibimbap.
 Doraji-jeonya – made of soaked and shredded balloon flower roots.
 Gangnangkong-jeonya – made of unripe beans.
 Seogi-jeonya – made of wide stone ear mushrooms.
 Songi-jeonya – made of matsutake mushrooms.
 Yangpa-jeonya – made of sliced onions.
 Yeongeun-jeonya – made of grated and strained lotus root.

Flower 
Hwajeon ("flower jeon") is a generic term for any jeon made of edible flowers. Hwajeons are usually sweet, with honey as an ingredient. Jeon made of jujube is sometimes called hwajeon.
 Chijahwa-jeon – made of gardenia flowers. 
 Gukhwa-jeon – made of chrysanths flowers.
 Jangmi-hwajeon – made of roses.
 Jindallae-hwajeon – made of rhododendron flowers. Jindallae-hwajeon is a special food item associated with Samjinnal.
 Okjamhwa-jeon – made of plantain lily buds.

Gallery

See also 
 Bindaetteok
 Buchimgae

Notes

References 
  
 

Korean pancakes
Korean cuisine
Pancakes
Rain